The Three-Layer Architecture is a hybrid reactive/deliberative robot architecture developed by R. James Firby that consists of three layers: a reactive feedback control mechanism, a reactive plan execution mechanism, and a mechanism for performing time-consuming deliberative computations.

See also 

 ATLANTIS architecture
 Servo, subsumption, and symbolic (SSS) architecture
 Distributed architecture for mobile navigation (DAMN)
 Autonomous robot architecture (AuRA)

References 

Robot architectures